Homeland is an unincorporated community in Polk County, Florida, United States. It has a post office, a general store, and historical park. It is part of the Lakeland–Winter Haven Metropolitan Statistical Area.

History
Peace Creek (now Bartow, Florida) and Fort Meade were the two largest cities in Polk County. Homeland was a stop midway between them, and gradually began to attract settlers. The original settlement was called Bethel, but the name was changed to Homeland. A school and several churches were built in the area. The school was closed down in 1956 as Homeland became eclipsed by its neighbor to the north, Bartow. The school building is now part of Homeland Heritage Park, an educational park for elementary Polk County school children.

Geography
Homeland is located approximately six miles south of the center of Bartow.

Demographics

References

Unincorporated communities in Polk County, Florida
Bartow, Florida
Unincorporated communities in Florida
Census-designated places in Florida